The Boeing 377 Stratocruiser was a large long-range airliner developed from the C-97 Stratofreighter military transport, itself a derivative of the B-29 Superfortress. The Stratocruiser's first flight was on July 8, 1947. Its design was advanced for its day; its innovative features included two passenger decks and a pressurized cabin. It could carry up to 100 passengers on the main deck plus 14 in the lower deck lounge; typical seating was for 63 or 84 passengers or 28 berthed and five seated passengers.

The Stratocruiser was larger than the Douglas DC-6 and Lockheed Constellation and cost more to buy and operate. Its reliability was poor, chiefly due to problems with the four 28-cylinder Pratt & Whitney R-4360 Wasp Major radial engines and  structural and control problems with their propellers. Only 55 Model 377s were built for airlines, along with the single prototype. The 377 was also converted into the Aero Spacelines Pregnant Guppy by John M. Conroy for NASA’s Gemini space program.

Design and development

The Boeing 377 Stratocruiser was a civil derivative of the Boeing Model 367, the Boeing C-97 Stratofreighter, which first flew in late 1944. William Allen, who had become president of the Boeing Company in September 1945, sought to introduce a new civilian aircraft to replace reduced military production after World War II. Boeing saw in their large-bodied, fast, and long-ranged military transport potential for a passenger aircraft suited for premium service on long transoceanic routes, expanding on the precedent set by their Boeing 314 Clipper with Pan American World Airways. Despite a recession in late 1945, Allen ordered 50 Stratocruisers, spending capital on the project without an order from an airline customer. His gamble that customers would be interested in Boeing's unique and expensive new airplane turned out to be correct for a brief period.

On November 29, 1945 Pan American World Airways (Pan Am) became the launch customer with the largest commercial aircraft order in history, a $24,500,000 order for 20 Stratocruisers.

The 377 shared the distinctive design of the C-97, with a "double-bubble" fuselage cross-section, resembling an inverted figure-8, with 6,600 ft³ (187 m³) of interior space shared between two passenger decks. Outside diameter of the upper lobe was 132 inches, compared to 125 inches for the DC-6 and other Douglas types (and 148 inches for today's 737). The lower deck served as a lounge, seating 14. The 377 had innovations such as higher cabin pressure and air conditioning; the superchargers on the four Pratt & Whitney R-4360 engines increased power at altitude and allowed constant cabin pressure. 

The wing was the Boeing 117 airfoil. In all, 4,000,000 man-hours went into the engineering of the 377.  It was one of a few double deck airliners, another being its French contemporary, the Breguet Deux-Ponts, as well as Boeing's own 747 and the Airbus A380. A total of 56 were built, one prototype (later reconditioned) and 55 production aircraft.

The first flight of the 377 was on July 8, 1947, two years after the first commercial order. The flight test fleet of three 377s underwent  of flying to test its limits before certification.

Adoption of the Stratocruiser got a boost from the US government, with a controversial incentive package offered to Northwest Orient Airlines for its purchase.  Its components were unusually generous mail contracts offered to Northwest for opening new routes to Hawaii and points in the western Pacific region that they were invited to apply for, and a Reconstruction Finance Corporation loan earmarked for the purchase of a fleet of Stratocruisers.  Pan-Am saw Northwest's mail contract deal and appealed for new terms in their own international mail contracts, which were granted much to the consternation of Trans World Airlines, who were able to provide the same Atlantic mail services as Pan-Am with lower operating costs.  The Northwest deal led to allegations of graft and political favoritism towards Boeing.  

The other carriers who adopted the Stratocruiser were British Overseas Airways Corporation, American Overseas Airlines (merged with Pan Am in 1950) and United Airlines.  The last 377 was delivered to BOAC in May 1950. On this delivery flight, Boeing engineer Wellwood Beall accompanied the final 377 to England, and returned with news of the de Havilland Comet, the first jet airliner, and its appeal.  The tenure of the Stratocruiser with United ended in 1954, when United had the opportunity to sell them to BOAC after finding them unprofitable without the extra mail subsidies enjoyed by Pan Am and Northwest.

Only 56 were built, one prototype (later reconditioned) and 55 production aircraft. As a result of low production volume, Boeing lost $7 million on the aircraft.

Operational history

As the launch customer, Pan Am was the first to begin scheduled flights, from San Francisco to Honolulu in April 1949. At the end of 1949 Pan Am, BOAC and American Overseas Airlines (AOA) were flying 377s transatlantic, while Northwest Orient Airlines was flying in the United States; in January 1950 United began flights from San Francisco to Honolulu. Stratocruisers were pressed into emergency military service after the onset of the Korean War. In late 1950 Northwest Stratocruisers were serving New York City, Chicago, Detroit, Minneapolis/St. Paul, Milwaukee, Spokane, Seattle, and Honolulu. 

By late 1952 Northwest Stratocruisers replaced DC-4s to Tokyo via Anchorage, Alaska; Northwest replaced the Stratocruiser on the Honolulu run in 1953 and to Tokyo in 1955. For a short time Pan Am 377s flew to Beirut, Lebanon, but after 1954 no 377 was scheduled east of Europe or west of Singapore. In 1954, United Stratocruisers flew Los Angeles to Honolulu and between Seattle and San Francisco; United's B377 flights to Honolulu were all first class. In 1955 BOAC 377s had 50 First Class seats (fare $400 one way New York to London) or 81 Tourist seats (fare $290).  In 1956 Pan Am 377s flew from Los Angeles and San Francisco to Sydney with stops at Honolulu, Canton Island and Suva (via Nadi Airport in Fiji). 

By 1958 Pan Am was operating the Stratocruiser between Seattle, Washington and Fairbanks, Juneau and Ketchikan, Alaska and between Seattle and Whitehorse, Yukon. Within six years of first delivery, the Stratocruiser had carried 3,199,219 passengers; it had completed 3,597 transcontinental flights, and 27,678 transatlantic crossings, and went between the United States and South America 822 times. In these first six years, the Stratocruiser fleet had flown 169,859,579 miles (273,362,494 km).

The 377 was one of the most advanced and capable of the propeller-driven transports, and among the most luxurious, but it was troubled by reliability issues and maintenance costs.  Problems included catastrophic failures of propellers, failures of propeller pitch control leading to overspeed incidents, problems related to the poor thermal design of the engine, and aerodynamic problems arising from design constraints imposed by the engine's thermal problems. Its service record was marred by a high incidence of in-flight emergencies and hull-loss accidents related to those issues. The propellers were the subject of Airworthiness Directives in 1955, 1957, and 1958.

In 1953 "United's [Chief Executive] Ray Ireland ...described the Stratocruiser as unbeatable in luxury attraction but is uneconomical. Ireland said PAA's Stratocruiser competition to Hawaii induced United to buy the plane originally." In 1950 United's seven 377s averaged $2.46 "direct operating cost" per plane-mile, and "Indirect costs are generally considered to be equal or greater than the direct costs." Most operators were using Stratocruisers on long-range routes where higher prices could be charged, off-setting the higher operating costs. 

The exception was Northwest Airlines, who managed to keep the aircraft competitive on shorter U.S. domestic routes where the aircraft's higher payload capacity benefited from lower fuel weights. United however could not integrate their six-plane fleet of 377s. By 1954 the lack of spares and the inability to cross-train their Douglas crews with the type relegated their Stratocruisers primarily to their Hawaii route, where they faced stiff competition from Pan American and Northwest. By the end of that year the six United 377s were all sold to BOAC in a deal orchestrated by Douglas Aircraft. BOAC, which was short of aircraft after the grounding of the Comet 1, paid between US$895,000 and US$995,000 per unit and spares for what were essentially five-year-old aircraft. An equivalent brand new Douglas DC-7 cost US$775,000 in 1954.

The longest (by distance) 377 nonstop flights were made by Pan Am from Tokyo to Honolulu during four winter seasons beginning in 1952–1953. In January 1953, two nonstops a week were scheduled with a flight time of 11 hr 1 min due to tailwinds; the following August all flights took 19 hours, with a stop at Wake Island Airfield.

By 1960 Stratocruisers were being superseded by jets: the de Havilland Comet, Boeing 707, and Douglas DC-8.  The last flight of the 377 with United was in 1954, the last with BOAC was in 1959, and the last with Northwest was in September 1960. In November 1960 only a weekly Pan Am Honolulu to Singapore flight remained, and the 377 was retired by Pan Am in 1961.  High operating costs (notably the fuel consumption and maintenance of the Wasp Major engines) led to rapid abandonment of the 377 with the onset of the jet era. Its contemporaries such as the Douglas DC-6 and the Lockheed Constellation continued longer, on secondary routes or rebuilt as freighters. A few 377s were sold to smaller airlines, used as freighters, or converted by Aero Spacelines into heavily modified enlarged freighters called Guppies. 

During 1959 and 1960, Transocean Airlines assembled a fleet of fourteen at bargain prices.  In 1960 TOA went bankrupt and only four were in operable condition.  The hulks were stored at Oakland International Airport through the 1960s and cannibalized for parts, contributing some to the Aero Spacelines Guppies. Five remaining 377s were modified by Bedek Aviation to resemble former U.S. Air Force Model 367 Stratofreighters and pressed into service with the Israeli Defense Force. Two were shot down during the course of their service and the three remaining 377Ms were retired in 1978 and later scrapped. None of the 56 377s built were preserved for display; the IAF Museum in Israel has a C-97 (4X-FPM) on display painted to resemble their most famous 377M, Masada.

Variants

377-10-19
Prototype Stratocruiser; one built. Later brought up to 377-10-26 standard and sold to Pan American World Airways in 1950.
377-10-26
20 delivered to Pan American World Airways with round windows and a rear galley.
377-10-26S
10 refitted with more powerful engines and a larger fuel capacity for Pan American transatlantic flights. Called the "Super Stratocruiser".
377-10-28
Four ordered by the Scandinavian Airlines System, but taken up by BOAC after SAS cancelled the order. Aircraft had similar features to the 377-10-26.
377-10-29
Eight delivered to American Overseas Airlines with round windows for the main cabin and rectangular windows for the lower cabin as well as an aft galley. AOA was merged with Pan Am the year after their delivery.
377-10-30
Ten for Northwest Orient Airlines with all rectangular windows and an aft galley.
377-10-32
Six for the British Overseas Airways Corporation (BOAC). Had a midships galley and all cabin windows were circular.
377-10-34
Seven for United Air Lines. Rectangular windows on the main cabin and circular windows on the lower cabin. Sold to BOAC circa 1954.
377F
Freighter conversion.
377M

In the early 1960s the Israeli Air Force wanted to upgrade to the C-130 Hercules, which could lift larger payloads, but it was expensive and sales were embargoed by the United States. Israel Aircraft Industries at Ben Gurion International Airport offered to modify Boeing 377 Stratocruisers. It had a stronger cabin floor which could handle cargo, plus a C-97 military Stratocruiser tail section, which included a clamshell cargo door. These were dubbed Anak (or Giant in Hebrew) and entered service in 1964. Three of these were modified by the use of a swing tail section, similar to the Canadair CL44D-4 airliner. Two others served as aerial tankers with underwing hose reel refueling pods. Two others were ELINT-platforms for electronic reconnaissance, surveillance and ECM (Electronic Counter Measures) missions. These were later joined by four KC-97Gs with the flying boom system.

Aero Spacelines Guppy

In addition to the Israeli Anaks a company called Aero Spacelines was converting old 377s to aircraft called Guppys in the 1960s. There were three types: the Pregnant Guppy, Super Guppy, and Mini Guppy. They had an extension to the top of the fuselage to enable them to carry large aircraft parts between manufacturing sites.

The first was the Pregnant Guppy, followed by the Super Guppy, and finally the Mini Guppy. The Super Guppy and the Mini Guppy had turboprop engines.

Aero Spacelines 377PG Pregnant Guppy
Conversion of one 377-10-26, incorporating an enlarged upper deck and a fuselage lengthened by 16 feet to carry sections of the Saturn V rocket. One converted.
Aero Spacelines 377SG Super Guppy
A single heavy-lift transport similar to the Pregnant Guppy built by Aero Spacelines. The aircraft contained parts of a YC-97J Stratofreighter and a 377-10-26 mated with a larger main fuselage, larger tail and Pratt & Whitney T34 turboprops.
Aero Spacelines SGT-201 Super Guppy Turbine
Four were built and were used by Airbus to carry aircraft parts between its factories. In the 1990s Airbus retired them due to rising operational costs and they have been replaced with Airbus Belugas. Two of the former Airbus Industrie Super Guppys remain in Germany and France, with a third being scrapped in December 2020 after eleven years of restoration at Bruntingthorpe Aerodrome in the UK. The fourth aircraft was acquired by NASA as part of a barter agreement with ESA for its role as a partner with the International Space Station.

Aero Spacelines 377MG Mini Guppy
Conversion of a 377-10-26, it featured a larger main cabin for oversize cargo, stretched wing and a hinged tail.
Aero Spacelines MGT-101 Mini Guppy Turbine
Originally designated the 377MGT. Similar to the 377MG, but powered by Allison 501-D22C turboprop engines. One built.

Operators

 Línea Internacional Aérea

 British Overseas Airways Corporation (BOAC)

 Israeli Air Force

 Nigeria Airways

 Svensk Interkontinental Lufttrafik, part of Scandinavian Airlines System (aircraft not delivered - passed to BOAC)

 American Overseas Airlines
 DAI Airways
 Northwest Orient Airlines
 Pan American World Airways
 Transocean Air Lines
 United Airlines

 Rutas Aéreas Nacionales SA

Accidents and incidents
This aircraft type suffered 13 hull-loss accidents between 1951 and 1970 with a total of 139 fatalities. The worst single accident occurred on April 29, 1952.  The aircraft type also experienced a significantly high rate of in-flight emergencies related to engine and propeller failure, resulting in Airworthiness Directives. 

Faults included structural failures of neoprene-cored propellers, failures of propeller pitch control resulting in overspeed, and failures related to engine cooling.  Six propeller failures between 1950 and 1955 resulted in separation or near-separation of engines from mounts, with two resulting in hull-loss accidents.  Directives were issued in 1950, 1955, and 1958 regarding enhanced maintenance and fault detection, in-flight vibration monitoring, and propeller replacement.  

A Directive concerning the pitch control system was issued after the October 16, 1956 hull-loss accident.  A June 1957 overspeed incident occurred on Romance of the Skies, after the compliance date of the Directive and less than six months before its fatal accident of November 8, 1957.  No hull-loss accidents after the loss of the Romance have been attributed to an overspeed incident.

 September 12, 1951
 United Air Lines Flight 7030, a Stratocruiser 10-34 (N31230, named Mainliner Oahu), was being used for a semi-annual instrument check of a captain. At 11:39 PDT, the flight was cleared for an ILS approach to the San Francisco Airport. The aircraft, with No. 4 propeller feathered, stalled and abruptly dived from an altitude of approximately 300 feet and was destroyed upon impact in San Francisco Bay. All three crew aboard were killed. The probable cause was an inadvertent stall at low altitude.
 April 29, 1952
 Pan Am Flight 202, a Stratocruiser 10-26 (N1039V, named Clipper Boa Esperança aka Clipper Good Hope) en route from Buenos Aires-Ezeiza and Rio de Janeiro–Galeão to New York via Port of Spain crashed in the jungle in the south of the State of Pará. Probable causes are the separation of the second engine and propeller from the aircraft due to highly unbalanced forces followed by uncontrollability and disintegration of the aircraft. All 50 passengers and crew died in the worst-ever accident involving the Boeing 377.
 July 27, 1952
 Pan Am Flight 201, a Stratocruiser 10-26 (N1030V) en route from New York and Rio de Janeiro-Galeão to Buenos Aires-Ezeiza suffered explosive decompression at about 12,000 feet about 20 miles south of Rio de Janeiro. A passenger was blown out and the cabin considerably damaged, but the aircraft was able to return to Rio de Janeiro and make a safe landing. The main cabin door had not been properly locked.
 December 25, 1954
 A BOAC Stratocruiser 10-28 (G-ALSA, named RMA Cathay) crashed on landing at Prestwick at 0330 hours, killing 28 of the 36 passengers and crew on board. The aircraft had been en route from London to New York City, when, on approach to Prestwick, it entered a steep descent before leveling-out too late and too severely, hitting the ground short of the runway.
 March 26, 1955
 Pan Am Flight 845/26, a Stratocruiser 10-26 (N1032V, named Clipper United States), ditched 35 miles (56 km) off the Oregon coast after the no. 3 engine and propeller tore loose from the wing, causing severe control difficulties. The aircraft sank after 20 minutes in water of about 1,600 m (5,200 ft) depth. There were four fatalities out of the 23 occupants, including two of the crew.
 April 2, 1956
 Northwest Orient Airlines Flight 2, a Stratocruiser 10-30 (N74608, named Stratocruiser Tokyo), ditched into Puget Sound after the flight engineer mistakenly failed to close the cowl flaps on the plane's engines, an error attributed to confusing instrument layout. Although all aboard escaped the aircraft after a textbook ditching, four passengers and one flight attendant succumbed either to drowning or to hypothermia before being rescued.
 October 16, 1956
  Pan Am Flight 6, a Stratocruiser 10-29 (N90943, named Clipper Sovereign of the Skies), ditched northeast of Hawaii during the last leg of an around-the-world flight from Philadelphia to San Francisco after two of its four engines failed following an overspeed incident. The aircraft was able to circle around USCG Pontchartrain until daybreak, when it ditched; all 31 on board survived.
 November 8, 1957
 Pan Am Flight 7, a Stratocruiser 10-29 (registered N90944, named Clipper Romance of the Skies), left San Francisco for Hawaii with 38 passengers and six crew. The 377 crashed around 5:25 p.m. in the Pacific Ocean. There were no survivors and the entire wreckage has never been found. Only 19 bodies and bits of debris were recovered. There is speculation that two passengers had a motive to bring the plane down. Eugene Crosthwaite, a 46-year-old purser, had shown blasting powder to a relative days prior to the flight, and had cut a stepdaughter from his will only one hour before the flight.  Pan Am concluded that there was sufficient evidence that Crosthwaite was the culprit.  William Payne, an ex-Navy demolitions expert, had taken out large insurance policies on himself just before the flight, and had a $10,000 debt he was desperate to pay off. The insurance investigator later suspected him of never being on the plane. His wife received at least $125,000 in payouts.  It was the opinion of the flight engineer during the Sovereign incident, and a pilot who had experienced an overspeed on the Romance less than six months before its loss, that an overspeed was a likely cause of the crash. The overspeed theory calls into question whether Pan Am was in compliance with an Airworthiness Directive concerning a weakness in the pitch control system, issued in response to the Sovereign incident the previous year.
 June 2, 1958
 A Pan Am Stratocruiser 10-26 (registration N1023V, named Clipper Golden Gate) was on a flight from San Francisco to Singapore via several intermediate stops. As the aircraft touched down at Manila (runway 06) in a heavy landing in rainy and gusty conditions, the undercarriage collapsed as a result of the hard landing. The plane skidded and swerved to the right, coming to rest 2,850 feet past the runway threshold and 27 feet from the edge of the runway. One of the passengers was killed when one of the blades of the number 3 propeller broke off, penetrating the passenger cabin.
 April 10, 1959
 At the conclusion of a flight from Seattle to Juneau, Alaska, a Pan Am Stratocruiser 10-26 (N1033V, named Clipper Midnight Sun) undershot on final approach and collided with an embankment. The aircraft caught fire and was destroyed, but all 10 passengers and crew survived.
 July 9, 1959
 A Pan Am Boeing Stratocruiser 10-29 (N90941, named Clipper Australia) belly landed at Haneda Airport following landing gear problems; all 59 passengers and crew on board survived, but the aircraft was written off.
 August 1967
 An Aero Spacelines Stratocruiser 10-29 (N90942) suffered a ground collision with Stratocruiser 10-32 N402Q at Mojave, California; the aircraft was damaged beyond repair.
 May 12, 1970
 An Aero Spacelines 377MGT (N111AS) was being test flown following conversion from a Boeing 377. During the sixth takeoff with one engine shut down, the aircraft turned and rolled to the left. The left wingtip then struck the ground and the aircraft yawed severely after which the forward fuselage struck the ground, destroying the cockpit. All four crew died.

Specifications (377)

See also

Notes

Further reading
 Air Disaster, Vol. 4: The Propeller Era, by Macarthur Job, Aerospace Publications Pty. Ltd. (Australia), 2001

External links

 Boeing 377 – Stratocruiser A very comprehensive enthusiast page on the type
 The Aviation History On-Line Museum – Boeing 377 Stratocruiser
 California Classic – The Boeing Model 377 Stratocruiser
 Stratocruiser article excerpts
 Anak (Israeli Boeing 377)
 "Speedbird Stratocruiser: A New Aircraft for B.O.A.C.'s Western Route", Flight magazine, January 27, 1949

377
377
Four-engined tractor aircraft
Low-wing aircraft
1940s United States airliners
Aircraft first flown in 1947
Four-engined piston aircraft
Double-deck aircraft